Denis Phipps (born July 22, 1985) is a Dominican professional baseball outfielder for the Charleston Dirty Birds of the Atlantic League of Professional Baseball. He played in Major League Baseball (MLB) for the Cincinnati Reds in 2012.

Career

Cincinnati Reds
He was called up to the majors for the first time on September 1, 2012. Phipps hit the first homer of his Major League career, a two-run shot against the Los Angeles Dodgers' Ronald Belisario on September 23, 2012.

He played in the Dominican Professional Baseball League six seasons with Estrellas Orientales before joining Leones del Escogido for the 2013/14 season, after posting in 17 games an average of .220. He won the 2012 Caribbean Series with Leones del Escogido, playing as a reinforcement and on loan from Estrellas Orientales.

Chicago White Sox
Phipps started the 2014 season with the Triple-A Charlotte Knights, an affiliate of the Chicago White Sox. He was released by the White Sox on May 9, 2014.

Broncos de Reynosa
He then joined the Broncos de Reynosa of the Mexican League to play the second half of the 2014 Mexican season.

Laredo Lemurs
He then joined the Laredo Lemurs from the American Association accumulating a .335 with 15 home runs and 15 doubles but being unable to reach the championship series, losing to Wichita in the semifinal round.

He played the 2015 season with Laredo Lemurs from the American Association ending with a .336 batting average after 17 home runs, 24 doubles, with 76 RBIs and a league tied leading 127 hits. He was selected to the league's post season all-star team.

For the 2015/16 season of the Nicaraguan Professional Baseball League he joined Gigantes de Rivas in October but he then signed with Caribes de Anzoátegui from the Venezuelan Professional Baseball League in November 2015 after posting a .205 batting average in 11 games. He debuted on 21 November 2015 and contributed with his team until losing in the playoffs. He finished the season batting .316 with 6 home runs and 4 doubles.

Acereros de Monclova
He then joined the Acereros de Monclova for the 2016 season. Before being released on May 24, 2016, he played 44 games with 8 homers.

Second Stint with Laredo Lemurs
He played his third season with the American Association team Laredo Lemurs, being chosen to play the 2016 American Association All-Star Game as Designate Hitter. Phipps played 92 games and with 24 home runs was league leader, also having 21 stolen bases, 62 RBI's and batted .280. He was the second player in the league who achieve having 20-plus home runs and 20-plus stolen bases.

He returned to the Venezuelan league with Caribes de Anzoátegui for the 2016/17 season, winning the Producer of the Year award and was third in the Most Valuable Player voting, when he batted .327 with 11 home runs, 40 runs batted ins and 46 scored. 

He then was unsuccessful with Caribes in the playoffs besides his 3 home runs and 12 RBI's that made him being chosen best player and later played the league's finals with Cardenales de Lara, but lost to Águilas del Zulia the championship. He was chosen to play the 2017 Caribbean Series with Zulia.

On April 20, 2017, Phipps signed with the Laredo Lemurs of the American Association of Independent Professional Baseball for his fourth season, but he became a free agent on May 8, 2017 when the Laredo Lemurs folded, with Phipps

Texas AirHogs
On May 17, 2017, Phipps signed with the Texas AirHogs of the American Association, finishing the season after 86 games with 18 doubles and lead the team in batting average with .314, 10 home runs and 58 runs batted in. He later started the 2017/18 Venezuelan Season with Anzoátegui, but was released in early November 2017 after only batting .123 and returned to the Nicaraguan league with Gigantes de Rivas.

Sugar Land Skeeters
On January 16, 2018, Phipps was traded by the Texas AirHogs of the American Association to the Sugar Land Skeeters of the Atlantic League of Professional Baseball. He officially signed with the team on May 14, 2018. He became a free agent following the 2018 season.

Phipps helped the Gigantes de Rivas to reach the Nicaraguan league final series, but they lost to the Tigres de Chinandega 2–3.

On April 15, 2019, Phipps re-signed with the Sugar Land Skeeters of the Atlantic League of Professional Baseball. He became a free agent following the season. 

Phipps later returned to play for the Caribes de Anzoátegui of the Venezuelan Professional Baseball League for the 2019–20 season.

On January 17, 2020, Phipps re-signed with the Skeeters. However, due to the COVID-19 pandemic, the ALPB season was canceled. He became a free agent in the offseason.

Tri-City ValleyCats
On February 24, 2021, Phipps signed with the Tri-City ValleyCats of the Frontier League. In 93 games, Phipps slashed .277/.354/.524 with 21 home runs and 62 RBIs. He became a free agent following the season.

Lexington Legends
On September 18, 2021, Phipps signed with the Lexington Legends of the Atlantic League of Professional Baseball. He became a free agent after the 2021 season.

Tri-City ValleyCats (second stint)
On November 21, 2021, Phipps re-signed with the Tri-City ValleyCats of the Frontier League for the 2022 season. After a 33 HR, 91 RBI season, Phipps was awarded the Frontier League's Designated Hitter of the Year honors for 2022.

Charleston Dirty Birds
It was announced on January 30, 2023, that Phipps would return to the ValleyCats for the 2023 season. However, on March 3, 2023, Phipps was traded to the Charleston Dirty Birds of the Atlantic League of Professional Baseball.

References

External links

1985 births
Acereros de Monclova players
Arizona League Reds players
Billings Mustangs players
Broncos de Reynosa players
Caribes de Anzoátegui players
Carolina Mudcats players
Charlotte Knights players
Cincinnati Reds players
Dayton Dragons players
Dominican Republic expatriate baseball players in Mexico
Dominican Republic expatriate baseball players in the United States
Estrellas Orientales players
Gulf Coast Reds players
Laredo Lemurs players
Lexington Legends players
Living people
Louisville Bats players
Lynchburg Hillcats players
Major League Baseball center fielders
Major League Baseball players from the Dominican Republic
Major League Baseball right fielders
Mexican League baseball left fielders
Mexican League baseball right fielders
Sportspeople from San Pedro de Macorís
Sarasota Reds players
Sugar Land Skeeters players
Texas AirHogs players
Tri-City ValleyCats players
Dominican Republic expatriate baseball players in Venezuela
Dominican Republic expatriate baseball players in Nicaragua